Kenny the Shark is an American animated television series produced by Discovery Kids. The series was first premiered on Discovery Kids' Saturday morning block on NBC on November 1, 2003, and ended with the last episode on February 19, 2005. Spanning two seasons and 26 episodes in total having aired. The series is about an anthropomorphic tiger shark named Kenny, who is tired of being a predator, and wants to live with a suburban family.

Production
Kenny the Shark was not Kenny's first appearance. In the late 1990s, a series of shorts featuring Kenny ran between regular programming. In the live-action film version, it starred male child actor Spencer Breslin. Kenny was not seen, as the camera was from his point of view. Unlike most animated shows that take place in fictional cities or states, etc., this show takes place in the real-life town of Tiburon, California.

Theme music
The series' theme music was performed by PFFR, who would later produce MTV2's Wonder Showzen and Adult Swim's Xavier: Renegade Angel.

Characters
 Kenny (voiced by Jim Conroy) is a sarcastic tiger shark. He is a comical character with a happy-go-lucky attitude. He was tired of life in the ocean and he went to live on the surface, where he is able to walk on his tailfins and breathe air like humans. He can't control himself when he hears or sees a seal. He lives with Kat (who can talk to him) and her family (who can also talk to him—rarely). He likes eating chum, fish, seal pops, seals and sushi. Like most anthropomorphic animals, Kenny is able to walk, using his tail fins as feet.
Katarina "Kat" Cassidy (voiced by Kelli Rabke) is a young school student is the only one who speaks in Kenny's language. She is obsessed with sharks. She is Kenny's owner and best friend. She is optimistic and fun-loving. She possesses rather unrealistic characteristics. She usually wears sandals like her parents, but later in the series she wears tennis shoes. She is Eurasian. In the episode ("I Love the Nightlife"), it has been revealed that her real name was Katarina. She is 10 years old, but in "Goodbye, Old Chum", she turns 11.
Karl Cassidy (voiced by Karen Culp) is Kat's youngest brother. He thinks that Kenny is a dog. He doesn't appear in most episodes. He is 1  years old.
Grace Cassidy(voiced by Karen Culp) is Kat and Karl's Asian mother and Peter's wife. She is a psychiatrist and runs her practice at her house. She is always kind and caring and she loves Kat, Karl, Kenny and her husband equally. Kenny sometimes accidentally scares off her patients, such as Mr. Luskerfish.
Peter Cassidy (voiced by Russell Horton) is Kat and Karl's Caucasian father and Grace's husband. He is an eco-sensitive hippie who owns a healthy grocery store. He gives Kat and Grace nicknames related to fruits and vegetables. He doesn't like Kenny because of his constant eating, shedding his teeth, and his tendency to break public property which costs him in fines. In the first season, Peter's hair is blonde, but in season 2, his hair is brown. 
Oscar (voiced by Nicolas King) is Kat's best human friend. He is obsessed with the Mayans, from whom he is descended.
 The Phoebes are a group of three racially diverse popular girls that share the same name. The first member is a Caucasian girl with blonde hair and blue eyes; the second one is Latina and the third and final one is African-American. Kat tries to be friends with them, but soon realizes they are mean, rude and sarcastic. They become Kat's rivals and refer to her as a "sea dweeb" because she likes sharks. They once "stole" the lead drummer (and the song) for Kat and Oscar's band, whom Kenny replaced. At first, they are afraid of Kenny, but they like him for his cuteness after seeing a film called Finding Nimoy (a parody of Disney-Pixar's 2003 film Finding Nemo) about a baby shark named Nimoy on a journey to return to his parents. They are a parody of the Heathers.
Burton Plushtoy III (voiced by Oliver Wyman) is a British obnoxious rich kid and one of Kat's rivals. He wants Kenny to be in his own private collection of exotic pets. He has been foiled by Kat twice. He has a British accent. He looks very much like Richie Rich, who is also a rich kid.
Merkins is Plushtoy's butler and henchman when trying to kidnap Kenny. He has a British accent, like Plushtoy.
Marty (voiced by Rob Bartlett) is a dachshund and Kenny's other best friend who occasionally gives Kenny advice. Kat seems to understand Marty as much as she understands Kenny. Marty bears a resemblance to his human owner.
Elly (voiced by Amy Love) is a bull shark from the aquarium, on whom Kenny has a crush. She appreciates Kenny being himself, and doesn't like him when he's not. After Marty helps save her from becoming sushi, she is shown batting her eyes at him when Kenny was going to bring her flowers. He throws them in the trash and leaves the aquarium. She is not seen or spoken of outside these two episodes. 
Captain Ahearn is the local, somewhat insane sailor captain who thinks all sharks are dangerous and tried to catch Kenny and kill him thinking that he is trying to protect Kat. After Kenny saved him from guard dogs, only because Kat commanded him to (which gives a real issue in ethics, considering Kenny wasn't even the one who put Capt. Ahearn's life in danger, so they still wouldn't be even, even if Capt. Ahearn died), they all become friends. He helps Kat and Kenny sometimes, and they helped him with a sleep-walking problem once in "Over the Ocean".
Brock is a local muscular former paperboy who appears to be a few years older than Kat. Like Kat, Brock also plays soccer. She used to crush on him, making her lose attention to Kenny. Jealous, Kenny scares Brock away twice, entirely on Marty's recommendation. He quits his job, thinking that he is under pressure. When the new paperboy, Larry, informs Kat about this, she spirals into depression, and Kenny tells her what he did. He insists to make it up to Kat, who says "I doubt it [that Kenny can make it up to her]," even though she deserves to make it up to him, for ignoring him. When she learns that Brock already has a girlfriend, she impulsively lies to him about being in a relationship with Larry (in whom she clearly has no interest). She apologises to Kenny, and a teenage boy comes to fix the pool. Kat falls in love with him, and Marty says, "I've seen this before." 
Grandma Pat is Kat and Karl's grandmother and Peter's mother. She loves Kenny. In the episode ("All You Can Eat"), Kenny takes advantage of her for feeding him.
Lola is Marty's girlfriend as seen in Kenny in Love.
Mr. Luskerfish is a psychiatrist who appeared in "Simply Irresistible".
Dr. Flossmore is the neighborhood dentist as seen in The Check Up. His last name is a parody on how he wants kids to "floss more". He had a bad eyeglasses prescription, causing him to mistake Kenny for Kat, Kat for Karl (who doesn't appear in this episode nor most episodes), and a water fountain for Grace. He is 47 years old.
Ms. Hattie is an ill-tempered elder seen in Naughty Naughty Kenny who seems nice at first, but then becomes "bad to the bone".
Gezabelle is Ms. Hattie's pet cat seen in Naughty Naughty Kenny.
Buster is a fierce-looking killer whale with a temperament to match. He thinks lowly of Kenny (due to tiger sharks being his natural prey), and has him do his bidding by threatening to swallow him.

Episodes

Season 1 (2003-2004)

Season 2 (2004-2005)

Broadcast
The series aired on Discovery Kids and premiered in the United States on November 1, 2003 (along with Tutenstein). The final episode aired on February 19, 2005. After the series ended, reruns continued to air on Discovery Family until August 28, 2022.

The series first broadcast internationally on CITV from April 2004 in the UK and later on DMAX.

Home media
The series was released on DVD in the United States by Genius Products and Discovery Home Entertainment with 2 volumes in 2007, and a third volume in 2008.

Three DVD volumes from Magna Pacific in Australia entitled "First Bite" (with 10 short episodes), "Second Bite" (with 8 short episodes) and "Third Bite" (with 8 short episodes) were released in 2005.

The first 10 episodes became available for purchase in the United States on the iTunes Store in 2009.

References

External links
 

2000s American animated television series
2003 American television series debuts
2005 American television series endings
American children's animated comedy television series
American children's animated education television series
Animated television series about fish
English-language television shows
Discovery Kids original programming
Television shows set in California